Phichai may refer to:

Phichai District
Phichai, Lampang
Phraya Phichai, historic Thai nobleman in the Ayutthaya period

See also 
Pichai (disambiguation)